Sangar-e Olya (also Romanized as Sangar-e ‘Olyā; also known as Sangar-e Bālā) is a village in Bakesh-e Yek Rural District, in the Central District of Mamasani County, Fars Province, Iran. At the 2006 census, its population was 71, in 13 families.

References 

Populated places in Mamasani County